Filgueirasia is a genus of Brazilian bamboo in the grass family.

Members of the genus were originally published as species of Apoclada and were classified in that genus for many years.

Over time though, with revised concepts of morphological interpretation in the bamboos and the accumulation of strong molecular evidence it became clear that the two species formerly known as A. arenicola, and A. cannavieira are actually unrelated to A. simplex and are correctly placed in their own genus Filgueirasia.

The genus was named after Dr. Tarciso Filgueiras who has been an icon of scholarly research on the grasses of Brazil, especially those of the cerrado region, for decades. There is a photograph of him in a patch of F. arenicola on the cover of the journal in which the genus was published - cited above and linked below.

Both species are unusual in many respects. They display the unique (or nearly so depending on interpretation) condition in the bamboos of having the ability to give rise to branches from multiple equal primary branch buds at their nodes. They are also some of the most drought tolerant of the bamboos and are well adapted to fire. They serve as forage for cattle and wildlife, especially in the dry season when the above ground parts of many other grasses are dead.  Although both species are highly adapted to the cerrado biome, they have separate ranges and different habitat requirements including soils and climate.

Species
 Filgueirasia arenicola (McClure) Guala  - Mato Grosso, Mato Grosso do Sul, Goiás
 Filgueirasia cannavieira (Silveira) Guala - 	Minas Gerais, Distrito Federal

References

External links
Guala, G.F. 2003. A new genus of bamboos from the cerrados of Brazil. Bamboo Science and Culture 17(1): 1-3.
Guala, G.F. 2001. A brief note on the forage value of Apoclada. Bamboo Science and Culture 15(1): 48.
Guala, G.F., D. Bogler, J. Sadle and J. Francisco Ortega 2000. Molecular Evidence for polyphyly in the genus Apoclada (Poaceae: Bambusoideae). Bamboo Science and Culture 14:(1): 15-20.
Guala, G.F. 2000. Spatial habitat characterization and predictions for two endemic  sister species of bamboo on the cerrados of central Brazil. Bamboo Science and Culture 14(1): 21-27.
Dr. Tarciso Filgueiras standing in a patch of Filgueirasia arenicola near Parque Nacional das Emas, Brazil in 1990
Filgueirasia cannavieira in flower near Brasilia in 1981.

Bambusoideae genera
Endemic flora of Brazil
Grasses of Brazil
Flora of Minas Gerais
Bambusoideae